There are many public markets, as well as several that were privately developed by, in Phnom Penh, Cambodia. Notable public markets include:

Gallery

Buildings and structures in Phnom Penh
Tourist attractions in Phnom Penh
Phnom Penh